Yubla (known to the Crusaders as Hubeleth), was a Palestinian village, located 9 kilometers north of Bisan in present-day Israel. It was depopulated during the 1948 Arab-Israeli war.

Location
The village was located 9 km north-northwest of Baysan, on the southern side of a natural, shallow valley through which the Wadi al-Tayyiba flowed.

History
The village was known to the Crusaders as Hubeleth, and Khirbat Umm al-Su´ud, about 1,5 km southeast of the village contained rough stone enclosures and traces of walls.

Ottoman era
In 1882, the PEF's Survey of Western Palestine found at Kh. Yebla:  "Heaps of stones. No indications of date."

British Mandate era
During the period of the British Mandate of Palestine the village was classified as a "hamlet" by the Palestine Index Gazetteer. Its houses were built along the roads, especially the one to  the spring Ain Yubla, north of the village.

In  the 1922 census of Palestine  Yubla had a population of 73 Muslims, increasing in the  1931 census   to 88, still all  Muslims, in 23  houses.

The villagers were working mostly in agriculture. In  the  1945 statistics the village had 210 Muslim inhabitants and the total land area was 5,165 dunams.  In 1944/45 a total of 25 dunums were used for citrus and bananas, 1,971 dunums were used for cereals,  37 dunums were irrigated or used for orchards, while 12 were built-up (urban) land.

1948, and after
By the time Israel's 'Barak' troops arrived in the village on 7 June 1948, a house-to house search found the village to be completely empty. In September 1948, local kibbutzniks argued for destroying the village.

Following the war the area was incorporated into the State of Israel. Kibbutz Beit HaShita and the Gush Nuris villages were given thousands of dunams of land from Yubla and the neighbouring villages of al-Murassas, Kafra, Qumiya, and Zir'in by the Histadrut's Agicrultural Center in July and October 1948.

Moledet was established 2 km north of the village site, on land which traditionally had belonged to Taibe. Walid Khalidi notes of the former village that, "The site and part of the lands are fenced in by barbed wire and are used by  Israeli as a cow pasture."

In 1992 the village site was described: "The site and part of the lands are fenced in by barbed wire and are used by Israelis as a cow pasture. A number of tall date palms, some almond trees, and cactuses grow near the village stream."

See also
Depopulated Palestinian locations in Israel

References

Bibliography

External links
Welcome to Yubla
 Yubla,  Zochrot
Survey of Western Palestine, map 9:   IAA, Wikimedia commons
Yubla, from the Khalil Sakakini Cultural Center

Arab villages depopulated during the 1948 Arab–Israeli War
District of Baysan